Panagiotis Therianos (born 4 January 1947) is a Greek boxer. He competed in the men's welterweight event at the 1972 Summer Olympics.

References

1947 births
Living people
Greek male boxers
Olympic boxers of Greece
Boxers at the 1972 Summer Olympics
Place of birth missing (living people)
Mediterranean Games bronze medalists for Greece
Mediterranean Games medalists in boxing
Competitors at the 1971 Mediterranean Games
Welterweight boxers
Sportspeople from Patras
20th-century Greek people